Stephen Kelly (born 20 September 1987) is an Irish Gaelic footballer and hurler who plays for the Wicklow senior Inter-county team since making his senior debut in 2009.

External links

Honours
 1 National Football League Division 4 2012
 1 Leinster Intermediate Club Football Championship 2011
 1 Wicklow Intermediate Club Football Championship 2011

References

1987 births
Living people
Wicklow inter-county Gaelic footballers
Éire Óg Greystones Gaelic footballers
Wicklow inter-county hurlers
Éire Óg Greystones hurlers
Dual players